Bangalore Srinivasarao Madhava Rao (29 May 1900 – 11 June 1987) was an Indian mathematician and physicist who served as a professor of mathematics at Central College, Bangalore. He worked on mathematical physics and collaborated with Max Born.

Biography 
Rao was born in Chamrajnagar to B. Srinivasa Rao and Rajee Bai. He studied mathematics, receiving his bachelor's degree from Mysore University and obtained his master's degree (1921) and D.Sc (1938) from University of Calcutta, the latter for his thesis on "Born's nonlinear field theory". He worked as Professor of Mathematics and later principal at Central college, Bangalore. Between 1955 and 1960 he was a Professor of Ballistics, Institute of Armament Technology, Pune and from 1960 to 1965 he was Professor of Applied mathematics at the University of Pune.

His early work was on classical algebraic geometry and analytical dynamics. Under the influence of Max Born and in collaboration with C. V. Raman and Homi J. Bhabha, Madhava Rao entered the mainstream of theoretical physics. To deal with the divergence problem in field theory, Born had introduced a nonlinear theory which received much attention as a model theory. Madhava Rao wrote eight research papers and his doctoral thesis on this work. He was also keenly interested in recreational mathematics and was working on a book on magic squares towards the end of his life.

Madhava Rao, Thiruvenkatachar, and Venkatachala Aiyengar discussed some aspects of non-commutative algebras. B. S. Madhava Rao investigated algebra of elementary particles.

Personal life 
He was married to Subhadra Bai. Madhava Rao took a keen interest in sports and was a life member of the National Sports Club of India. He died on 11 June 1987.

Awards and honours 
 Srinivasa Ramanujan Prize (University of Madras) (1945) - Contributions to Algebra Related to Elementary Particles of Nature.  
 Fellow, Indian National Science Academy and Fellow, Indian Academy of Sciences, Bangalore
 Life Member (President, 1959–61), Indian Mathematical Society and Royal Astronomical Society.

References

External links 
 Scanned letters and photos from family archives
 Thesis - Contributions To Born's Field Theory

1900 births
1987 deaths
20th-century Indian physicists
Scientists from Bangalore
University of Calcutta alumni
People from Chamarajanagar
20th-century Indian mathematicians